Events in the year 1852 in Norway.

Incumbents
Monarch: Oscar I

Events
The Sami revolt in Guovdageaidnu.

Arts and literature

Births
10 February – Svend Borchmann Hersleb Vogt, jurist and politician (died 1923)
13 August – Christian Krohg, painter, illustrator, author and journalist (died 1925)
4 September – Eilif Peterssen, painter (died 1928)
5 September – Hans Henrik Reusch, geologist (died 1922)
23 December – Jens Ludvig Andersen Aars, politician (died 1919)

Full date unknown
Erik Enge, politician and Minister (died 1933)
Gunnar Olavsson Helland, Hardanger fiddle maker (died 1938)

Deaths
8 June – Johan Bülow Wamberg, politician, (born 1786)
3 July – Jonas Schanche Kielland, consul and politician (born 1791)
12 October – Haagen Ludvig Bergh, politician (born 1809)

Full date missing
Maria Nubsen, midwife (born c.1780).

References

See also